West Ham United narrowly escaped relegation by finishing 17th in the First Division in the 1976–77 season.

Season summary
Although West Ham ended their run of seven months without a League victory in August 1976 by beating Queens Park Rangers, they dropped to the bottom of the table after failing to win any of their other first twelve League games. At the start of April 1977, they still occupied last place, but after a succession of draws they beat Manchester United 4–2 at Upton Park in their last fixture to avoid relegation by two points, having lost just one of their last thirteen matches. Perversely, many of their better performances came against teams towards the top of the table: as well as doing a League double over Manchester United, they took three points off the champions Liverpool and also beat Arsenal at Highbury and Manchester City at home. Pop Robson, who had re-signed for the club from Sunderland, was their top scorer with 14 goals.

West Ham also struggled in the cups, and they were convincingly beaten by Aston Villa in the fourth round of the FA Cup.

League table

Results

Football League First Division

FA Cup

League Cup

Players

References

1976-77
English football clubs 1976–77 season
1976 sports events in London
1977 sports events in London